Bay Horse railway station (also known as Bayhorse station) was a rural station in Lancashire, England. It was named after the nearby Bay Horse Inn, and later the small hamlet of Bay Horse developed around the station.

The station opened in 1840 on the Lancaster and Preston Junction Railway, by a level-crossing on Whams Lane.

In the 1840s, Jack Smith, an engine driver frustrated by having to wait every Sunday for the level crossing gate to be opened, carried out his threat to drive through the closed gate. The impact was sufficient to derail the small engine, although nobody was injured.

A much more serious accident occurred on 21 August 1848, when a northbound  to Glasgow express ploughed into the back of a local train stopped at the station. A woman was killed and about twenty passengers were injured. The woman's 18-month-old child was thrown out of the carriage window but was barely injured.

On 24 October 1861, a northbound mail train collided with a goods train at the station, but only a driver, fireman and one passenger were injured.

The station closed to passengers on 13 June 1960, and to goods on 18 May 1964; the last but one to close on the Preston to Lancaster section of the West Coast Main Line, though the line itself continues.

References

 

Disused railway stations in Lancaster
Railway stations in Great Britain opened in 1840
Railway stations in Great Britain closed in 1960
1840 establishments in England
Former London and North Western Railway stations